A statue of Lucas Sullivant by Michael Foley is installed in Columbus, Ohio's Genoa Park, in the United States. The sculpture was commissioned by the Franklinton Historical Society in 2000, and unveiled on May 6. The plinth depicts scenes from Franklinton's origins.

See also
 2000 in art

References

External links

 

2000 establishments in Ohio
2000 sculptures
Franklinton (Columbus, Ohio)
Monuments and memorials in Ohio
Outdoor sculptures in Columbus, Ohio
Sculptures of men in Ohio
Statues in Columbus, Ohio